Simanica is a genus of moths belonging to the family Tortricidae.

Species
Simanica stenoptera Razowski, 1997

See also
List of Tortricidae genera

References

 , 1997: Euliini (Lepidoptera: Tortricidae) of Peru with descriptions of new taxa and list of the New World genera. Acta Zoologica Cracoviensia 40: 79-105.

External links
tortricidae.com

Euliini
Tortricidae genera